Warrane is a suburb of Hobart, Tasmania, Australia, within the City of Clarence local government area. It is located between Rosny Park and Mornington and runs parallel to the Tasman Highway.

Warrane is a primarily residential suburb, and is served by Rosny Park for commercial services.

Public facilities include Warrane Primary School, Clarence Campus of The Tasmanian Polytechnic and the Tasmanian Academy (formerly TAFE Tasmania). St. Peter's Lutheran Church is located there.

History
The current Post Office opened on 1 June 1955. An earlier office named Montagu Bay opened in 1923, was renamed Warrane that year, Montagu Bay in 1944 and closed in 1951.

Sporting amenities

The Warrane Sports Centre,

Warriors Park (Formerly the Warrane Hockey Centre) an AstroTurf Pitch and is the home of Hobart Olympia Warriors,

The North Warrane Oval is sheltered by the Meehan Range and is home to the Eastern Suburbs Rugby Union Football Club Inc., MacKillop Beltas Cricket Club and Nelson Eastern Suburbs FC.

Meehan Range
On its north-eastern side, Warrane abuts the Meehan Range, a bushland area with bush walks, cliffs, and views of Mount Wellington and surrounding areas. The ranges are home to native wildlife including Tasmanian devils and tiger snakes.

References

External links
TAFE Tasmania
City of Clarence
Eastern Suburbs Rugby Union Football Club
Nelson Eastern Suburbs Football Club
Olympia Football Club
MacKillop Beltas Cricket Club 

Localities of City of Clarence